The following is a partial list of Purdue University faculty, including current, former, emeritus, and deceased faculty, and administrators at Purdue University.

Notable faculty

Agriculture
 Gebisa Ejeta – Professor of Agronomy, winner of World Food Prize
 Philip E. Nelson – food scientist, winner of the World Food Prize

Engineering and technology
 Rakesh Agrawal (Professor of Chemical Engineering) – a winner of National Medal of Technology
 Arden L. Bement Jr. (Professor of Nuclear Engineering) –  Director of the National Science Foundation, former Director of NIST
 Lonnie D. Bentley – professor of computer and information technology
Sabine Brunswicker – associate professor and director of Research Center for Open Digital Innovation (RCODI)
 Jean-Lou Chameau (Professor of Civil Engineering) –  President of California Institute of Technology
 Clarence L. "Ben" Coates (Head of the School of Electrical Engineering) – computer scientist and engineer known for his work on waveform recognition devices, circuit gates and accumulators
 Supriyo Datta (Professor of Electrical Engineering) – researcher of nanoelectronics
 Rui de Figueiredo (Professor of Electrical Engineering)
 Charles Alton Ellis (Professor of Structural Engineering) – designer of the Golden Gate Bridge
 Reginald Fessenden (Professor of Electrical Engineering) – first wireless voice transmission
 W. Kent Fuchs (Professor of Electrical and Computer Engineering) –  Provost of Cornell University
 Leslie Geddes (Showalter Distinguished Professor Emeritus of Biomedical Engineering) –  National Medal of Technology recipient
 Frank Bunker Gilbreth, Sr. (lecturer) – industrial engineer
 Lillian Gilbreth (Professor of Industrial Engineering) –  efficiency expert, first female member of U.S. National Academy of Engineering
 F.W. Hutchinson – engineer and researcher of heating, ventilation, and air conditioning
 Kathleen Howell - astrodynamist known for deep space spacecraft mission design using halo orbits
 Frank P. Incropera (Professor of Mechanical Engineering) – ISI highly cited researcher on heat transfer
 Leah Jamieson (Professor of Electrical and Computer Engineering and Dean of Engineering) – a winner of Gordon Prize
 Avinash Kak (Professor of Electrical and Computer Engineering) – researcher of information processing
 Rangasami L. Kashyap (Professor of Electrical Engineering) – applied mathematician
 Linda Katehi (Professor of Electrical Engineering and Dean of Engineering) – Chancellor of University of California, Davis
 Daniel B. Luten (Instructor in architectural and sanitary engineering) – bridge builder who patented the Luten arch
 Robert E. Machol (Professor of Electrical Engineering) – early writer on systems engineering
 Shimon Y. Nof (Professor of Industrial Engineering)
Nicholas A. Peppas (Professor of Chemical Engineering) – biochemist and engineer best known for his research in hydrogels for drug delivery
R. Byron Pipes (Professor of Engineering) – former President of Rensselaer Polytechnic Institute
 A. Alan Pritsker (Professor of Industrial Engineering) – pioneer in simulation modeling, creator of GERT and SLAM programs
 Vladimir Shalaev (Professor of Electrical and Computer Engineering and of Biomedical Engineering) – researcher of metamaterials, transformation optics, nanophotonics and plasmonics
 R. Norris Shreve (Professor of Chemical Engineering)
 Shu Shien-Siu (Professor of Engineering Science)
 Mete Sozen (Professor of Structural Engineering)
 Rusi Taleyarkhan (Professor of Nuclear Engineering)
 Yeram S. Touloukian (Professor of Mechanical Engineering) – founder of the Thermophysical Properties Research Center
 Raymond Viskanta – ISI Highly Cited researcher in the field of heat transfer
 Steve Wereley (Professor of Mechanical Engineering) – co-inventor of micro-particle image velocimetry
 Jerry Woodall (Professor of Electrical Engineering) – inventor of first commercially viable red LEDs, a winner of National Medal of Technology
 Henry T. Yang (Professor of Aeronautical and Astronautical Engineering and Dean of Engineering) – Chancellor of the University of California, Santa Barbara

Humanities and social sciences
 Dorsey Armstrong – editor-in-chief of Arthuriana
 Louis René Beres – Professor of Political Science
 James A. Berlin – theorist in the field of composition studies and the history of rhetoric and composition theory
 Marianne Boruch – poet and essayist
 Robert X. Browning – Professor of Political Science
 Ronald Verlin Cassill –  novelist, short story writer, reviewer, editor, painter, and lithographer
 Philip B. Coulter – political scientist
 Paul Draper – philosopher of religion, editor of the journal Philo
 William H. Gass – novelist and short story writer
 Mark Harris – novelist and biographer
 Djelal Kadir – literature academic
 Brigit Pegeen Kelly – poet
 Emma Montgomery McRae – Professor of Literature, Dean of Women
 Robert Melson – political scientist specializing in ethnic conflict and genocide
 Cheryl Mendelson – professor of philosophy, novelist, non-fiction writer
 Alan H. Monroe – creator of Monroe's motivated sequence
 Annie Smith Peck – professor of archaeology and Latin, mountaineer
 Victor Raskin – Professor of Linguistics, founding editor of Humor: International Journal of Humor Research
 W. Charles Redding – professor of communication, "father" of organizational communication Gunther E. Rothenberg – military historian
 Kermit Scott – professor of philosophy, advocate for the poor, previously thought to be the namesake of Kermit the Frog
 Michael Stohl – political scientist

Management and economics
 Charalambos D. Aliprantis – economist who introduced Banach space and Riesz space methods in economic theory
 Frank Bass – Professor of Industrial Administration, a founder of marketing science who developed the Bass diffusion model
 Michael A. Campion – Professor of Management, psychologist
 Alok R. Chaturvedi – Professor of MIS, Founder and the Director of SEAS Laboratory of Krannert School of Management
 Elizabeth Hoffman – economist, now Provost of Iowa State University
 Raghavendra Rau – Rothschild Professorship of Finance at the University of Cambridge
 Stanley Reiter – economist
 Vernon L. Smith – Nobel Laureate in Economics in 2002
Shailendra Raj Mehta - President & Director of MICA

Pharmacy, health and human sciences
 Sugato Chakravarty – professor of consumer science, Associate Editor of the Journal of Financial Markets Lisa Hopp – nursing educator
 Henry L. Roediger III – researcher of psychology and the human memory
 Peter Schönemann – professor of Psychological Sciences
 William H. Starbuck – researcher of cognitive psychology, organizational behavior, and organization theory
 Wei Zheng – pharmaceutical scientist

Science and mathematics
 Shreeram Shankar Abhyankar – Professor of Mathematics, known for his contributions to singularity theory
 Ross H. Arnett, Jr. – entomologist and beetle researcher
 Struther Arnott – molecular biologist and cancer researcher
 Mikhail Atallah – computer scientist, researcher on algorithms and computer security
 Louis Auslander – mathematician
 David Avison – physicist and photographer
 John D. Axtell – chemist, agronomist, a discoverer of high-lysine sorghum
 Harry Beevers – plant physiologist
 Jeffrey Bennetzen – Professor of Genetics
 Elisa Bertino – computer scientist, director of CERIAS
 Dale L. Boger – medicinal and organic chemist
 Carl R. de Boor – assistant professor at Purdue University, won the John von Neumann Prize from the Society for Industrial and Applied Mathematics in 1996
 Louis de Branges de Bourcia – Professor of Mathematics,  proved the Bieberbach conjecture
 Herbert C. Brown – Nobel Laureate in Chemistry in 1979
 Alok R. Chaturvedi – professor in the Department of Computer Sciences; the Director of Purdue Homeland Security Institute; technical lead for the Sentient World Simulation project
 Douglas Comer – computer scientist, Internet pioneer
 R. Graham Cooks – chemist, mass spectrometrist
 Ronald DeVore – mathematician known for approximation theory, wavelet theory, compressive sensing
 Richard Duffin – physicist 
 Ahmed K. Elmagarmid – computer scientist, Executive Director of the Qatar Computing Research Institute
 Paul Erdős – Professor of Mathematics, winner of the Wolf Prize in Mathematics in 1983/4
 Harley Flanders – mathematician and textbook author
 Joseph Francisco – atmospheric chemist, President of the American Chemical Society
 Walter Gautschi – mathematician, contributor to numerical analysis
 Jayanta Kumar Ghosh – statistician
 Melvin Hochster – commutative algebraist
 Otto F. Hunziker – early head of Dairy department, supervised construction of Smith Hall
 Meyer Jerison – mathematician known for his work in functional analysis and rings
 Minhyong Kim – mathematician
 Robert R. Korfhage – computer scientist who contributed to information retrieval
 Karl Lark-Horovitz – pioneer in solid state physics, contributed to the invention of the first transistor
 Chris J. Leaver – botanist, now at the University of Oxford
 László Lempert, professor of mathematics, winner of Stefan Bergman Prize, 2001
 Bernard J. Liska – food scientist
 Fred McLafferty – chemist who described the McLafferty rearrangement in mass spectrometry
 Edwin T. Mertz – chemist and biochemist who co-discovered high-lysine corn
 Dan Milisavljevic - astronomer and physicist
 David S. Moore – statistician
 John Ulric Nef – chemist who discovered the Nef reaction
 Ei-ichi Negishi – Professor of Chemistry, Nobel Laureate in Chemistry in 2010
 Albert Overhauser – Professor of Physics, discovered the Overhauser Effect
 Alan Perlis – Professor of Mathematics, the first person to win the Turing Award in 1966
 Justin Jesse Price – mathematician
 John R. Rice – Professor of Computer Science, founding editor of ACM Transactions on Mathematical Software''
 Arthur Rosenthal – mathematician, proved the Hartogs–Rosenthal theorem
 Michael G. Rossmann – Professor of Biological Sciences, Member of National Academy of Sciences, mapped human common cold virus, pointed out the Rossmann fold
 Robert G. Sachs – theoretical physicist, director of Argonne National Laboratory
 David Sanders – Professor of Biological Sciences
 Otto Schilling – algebraist
 Julian Schwinger – Nobel Laureate in Physics in 1965
 Freydoon Shahidi – mathematician, a namesake of the Langlands–Shahidi method
 Shen Chun-shan – physicist, president of National Tsing Hua University
 Yum-Tong Siu – professor of mathematics
 Jeffrey H. Smith – algebraic topologist
 Eugene Spafford – Professor of Computer Science and Director of CERIAS, computer security expert
 Lonnie Lee VanZandt – Professor of Physics, formed the molecular biological physics group at Purdue
 Jeffrey Vitter (Professor of Computer Science and Dean of Science, 2002–2008) – computer scientist known for his work on external memory algorithms, provost of University of Kansas
 Clarence Abiathar Waldo – Professor of Mathematics, noted for his role in defeating the Indiana Pi Bill of 1897
 George W. Whitehead – algebraic topologist who defined the J-homomorphism
 Harvey Washington Wiley – Professor of Chemistry, first FDA commissioner and advocate for the Pure Food and Drug Act of 1906
 Arthur Winfree – theoretical biologist, MacArthur Fellow, winner of the Norbert Wiener Prize in Applied Mathematics
 Myron E. Witham – Professor of Mathematics, college football coach
 Arif Zaman – Professor of Statistics, researcher of pseudo-random number generation and computer science
 Jian-Kang Zhu - Distinguished Professor of Plant Biology

Other
 Richard Blanton –  anthropologist and archaeologist
 David A. Caputo – former Dean of the School of Liberal Arts, later president of Pace University
 Amelia Earhart – women's career counselor, aviator
 Joel Fink – Purdue University Theatre, currently Associate Dean of Roosevelt University
 Benjamin Harrison – trustee, President of the United States
 Ruth Lawanson – volleyball assistant coach, Olympic bronze medal in volleyball (1992).
 Charles Major – trustee, novelist
 Gary Lee Nelson – composer
 Jay Nunamaker – researcher of information systems
 Lynn Okagaki – Commissioner of the National Center for Education Research 
 John Purdue – founder and namesake
 Timothy Sands – provost, former acting president, materials engineer, President of Virginia Tech
 Mark Smith – Dean of Graduate School, 1984 Olympic fencer.
 Dorothy C. Stratton – first full-time dean of women (1933–1942), Director of the SPARS during World War II
 Lee Watson – Broadway and television lighting designer
 Randy Woodson – former provost, now chancellor of North Carolina State University
 Al G. Wright – former Director of Bands, now Chairman of the Board of the John Philip Sousa Foundation
 Rolv Yttrehus – contemporary classical music composer

References

+
Purdue University faculty